The Silver River is a  river in the U.S. state of Michigan.

References 

Rivers of Michigan
Rivers of Baraga County, Michigan
Tributaries of Lake Superior